Mesalina austroarabica is a species of sand-dwelling lizard in the family Lacertidae. It is endemic to Oman.

References

austroarabica
Reptiles described in 2018